Abrafo is a small village located in Twifo/Heman/Lower Denkyira District of the Central Region of Ghana about 30 kilometers north of Cape Coast.

Geography

Location
Abrafo is situated at the entrance to Kakum National Park. The village is accessible by a paved road from Cape Coast.

Economy
The village is mainly a small agricultural outpost, but at the border of the  Kakum National Park there are several small restaurants and shops.

See also
 Hemang Lower Denkyira (Ghana parliament constituency)

References

External links
 Central Region - Touring Ghana

Populated places in the Central Region (Ghana)